Mandir Wahi Banayenge is a 2019 Indian Bhojpuri-language  action drama film directed by Praveen Kumar Guduri and produced by Chandan Bhansali and Mahesh Upadhyay with co-produced by Shankar Shukla and Ram Mishra. The film presented by "Aadishakti Entertainment" and "Sohum Films" under banner of "SRV Production House", "Maahi Movies Entertainment". Pradeep Pandey  has been cast in the lead role along with Nidhi Jha while Sushil Singh, Samarth Chaturvedi, Anoop Arora, Kiran Yadav, Krishna Kumar, Mahesh Acharya, Prakash Jais and Prem Dubey feature in supporting roles. Item queen Seema Singh and Priti Dhyani make a special appearance in songs. It is written by Indrajeet S. Kumar. The film's music was composed by Madhukar Anand and Chotte Baba.

Plot
The story begins from Mumbai where Jatashankar lives with his wife Pramila and his daughter Siya . Siya gets married early in childhood to Chintu Pandey, son of Pandit Ramnarayan Pandey, a resident of Ayodhya but Siya does not consider this marriage. One day Jatashankar tells his daughter Siya that he will go to Ayodhya and stay at Pandit Ram Narayan's house for a few days and if he understands Chintu Pandey, then even if he does not like Chintu Pandey, he will marry her wherever he wishes. Then Siya goes to Ayodhya with her friends and gets angry when she know that her husband is an auto driver, but she goes to Chintu's house. Chintu offers him and all his friends a trip to Ayodhya, slowly slowly Siya also falls in love with Chintu. After a few days, Siya's friends go back to Mumbai, while telling Siya that Chintu will be better husband for her and he is very much love him. At the same time, Siya's lover Rocky takes Siya, Chintu Pandey protects Siya. Siya also now accepts Chintu Pandey as her husband.

Meanwhile, Sultan is entered and wants to build a big five star hotel in the city but due to a temple near the hotel, he is unable to start the work of the hotel. So he goes to meet Dashanan to ask for help and both of them The deal is finalised. Dashanan promises the Sultan that he will remove the temple from there. Chintu takes Siya to visit his ancestral temple at the behest of his parents, but he forgets to take water to the temple. Leaving Siya in the temple, he goes to get water outside. At the same time there is a big bomb blast in the temple at the behest of Dashanan, in which many people die, Chintu also considers Siya dead. But just before the explosion, Rocky kidnaps Siya from the temple and hides her in an under construction building. But Siya senses Rocky and get a mobile phone and she make phone call to Chintu and telling that he is not dead, he is alive and that he is in Rocky's captivity. Then Chintu traces Siya along with all his rickshaw driver friends and finally reaches Siya, where a fierce fight in between Chintu and Rocky and Rocky goes into coma. Seeing this, Rocky's father Dashanan gets furious and starts searching for Chintu.Cinku goes to his house with Siya, where Siya tells that the bomb blast in the temple was done by Dashanan. Chintu then takes a compilation to take revenge on Dashanan and says "Saugandh Raam Ki Khate Hain Mandir Wahi Banayenge". He convinces Prakash Yadav, who is an actor, to do a sting operation of Dashanan and he make a video. Chintu sends the video to Dashanan and demands that all those who died in the bomb blast be given fair compensation and rebuild the temple as before. Darshanan gets angry after watching the video, and kidnaps Chintu's brother Akash and friend Kariyawa. He burns Kariyawa to death. Then Chintu Pandey comes there and there is a lot of fighting between Dashanan and Chintu. Sultan and Dashanan are killed by Chintu's hands.

Cast
Pradeep Pandey as Chintu Pandey
Nidhi Jha as Siya
 Sushil Singh as Dashanan
 Mantosh Kumar as Rocky (Dashanan's Son) 
 Anoop Arora as Ramnarayan Pandey (Chintu's Father)
Kiran Yadav as Chintu's Mother
Krishna Kumar as Aakash Pandey (Chintu's elder Brother) 
 Shweta Verma "Mona" as Aakash's wife
Mahesh Acharya as Kariyawa (Chintu's friend)
 Bablu Khan as Bablu (Chintu's friend)
 Samarth Chaturvedi as Sultan
 Prakash Jais as Prakash Yadav
 Sanjay Verma as A Drunker
 Priti Dhyani as Special appearance in song
 Seema Singh as Special appearance in song

Production
The film was shot in the beautiful locations of Faizabad, Balrampur and Gonda district of Uttar Pradesh with some scenes shot in Halol and Vadodara of Gujarat.

It was speculated that 'Mandir Wahi Banayenge' will give rise to unnecessary debates upon its release; however, nothing controversial was found once the film got screened. In fact, it has come out to be a total commercial film.

Madhukar Anand and Chhote Baba have given the music while Mahesh Venkat has done the cinematography. Action sequence and stunts have been performed under the guidance of Hira Yadav. Kanu Mukherjee, Pappu Khanna and Ramdevan choreographed the dance numbers. Art direction done Bhaskar Tiwari and Nazir Shaikh while post-production done in "Eye Focus Studio". Dress designed by Ashutosh Gautam and Niraj Maurya. Publicity designed by Narsu Behara (Shakti Arts).

Release
The film was theatrically released on 8 February 2019 across Bihar and Jharkhand, has received a bumper opening all over. On 1 March 2020, film also released across Mumbai and Gujarat theatre.

Soundtrack

The soundtrack for "Mandir Wahi Banayenge" was composed by Madhukar Anand and Chhote Baba with lyrics penned by Pyare Lal Yadav, Shyam Dehati and Pawan Pandey. The soundtrack included an unusually large number of songs at 8. It was produced under the "Wave Music" label, who also bought his satellite rights.

References

2019 films
2010s Bhojpuri-language films